Attention restoration theory (ART) asserts that people can concentrate better after spending time in nature, or even looking at scenes of nature. Natural environments abound with "soft fascinations" which a person can reflect upon in "effortless attention", such as clouds moving across the sky, leaves rustling in a breeze or water bubbling over rocks in a stream. Philosophically, nature has long been seen as a source of peace and energy, yet the scientific community started rigorous testing only as recently as the 1990s which has allowed scientific and accurate comments to be made about if nature has a restorative attribute.

The theory was developed by Rachel and Stephen Kaplan in the 1980s in their book The experience of nature: A psychological perspective, and has since been found by others to hold true in medical outcomes as well as intellectual task attention, as described below.  Berman et al. discuss the foundation of the attention restoration theory (ART).  "ART is based on past research showing the separation of attention into two components: involuntary attention, where attention is captured by inherently intriguing or important stimuli, and voluntary or directed attention, where attention is directed by cognitive-control processes."

Restorative environments 
Restoration or psychological restoration in the environmental psychology field is the recovery of depleted resources which can be psychological (attention and emotions), physiological (stress) and/or social. This results from interaction with a restorative environment to change negative states to positive ones. Psychological restoration can be described as the capability of perception of restoration, as an observer can perceive the properties of an environment that relieves the mental fatigue and stress in a person.

The Kaplans describe a series of characteristics that an environment must have to be restorative.  Fascination: the ability of an environment to generate awe in people; the amount of awe can give the directed attention a rest as the involuntary attention appears in its place. Being away: a feeling that can be objective or subjective in form, e.g. a person can be far away from a location or can let his or her mind go from everyday life and worries. Extension: the connection between each element found in an environment; the feeling of being able to travel through the environment in order to look for the information it provides.  Compatibility: characteristics found in an environment that meet the preferences and goals of a person.

Mental fatigue 

Human beings are constantly seeking and evaluating information. In general we are quite skilled with evaluating and discerning information from environmental stimuli. The function of directed attention is to prioritize stimuli from the environment and effectively ignore irrelevant information. The effectiveness of attention will diminish over time with constant use. This world-wide, everyday phenomenon is known as mental fatigue, which increases the difficulty of discriminating environmental stimuli and prioritizing relevant information. The weakening of directed attention leads to being increasingly more distracted. There are six main areas that are affected during mental fatigue: input, thinking, behavior, executive functioning, emotions and social interactions.

Goal-directed attention is affected the most by mental fatigue, while stimulus-driven attention is minimally affected or not at all affected by mental fatigue. This typically results in being more easily distracted and less flexible, making noticeable or important stimuli even more powerful. Human behavior steadily becomes increasingly linked to environmental stimuli. Mental fatigue is also part of occupational burnout, where cognitively, we distance ourselves or check out from our work because goal-directed attention capacity has decreased.

Aesthetic, yet unimportant or secondary, stimuli can prove effective in combating mental fatigue. Attention restoration theory claims that looking at natural landscapes, such as beaches, forest or mountain landscapes will allow for your mind to sit in the default mode network, to wander freely and thereby relaxing the stringent focus of everyday life. The mind-wandering provided in the default mode network will allow for the mind to restore its directed attention capacities.

Directed attention
Attention restoration theory describes various possible human states of attention:
 Directed attention
 Directed attention fatigue
 Effortless attention
 Restored attention

Tasks that require mental effort draw upon "directed attention". People must expend effort to achieve focus, to delay expression of inappropriate emotions or actions, and to inhibit distractions. That is, they must concentrate on the higher task, avoiding distractions. Performing the actual task also requires other knowledge and skills. Attention can only be maintained for so long without starting to decrease, a feeling described by many as "tired" or "stressed out".

In Peopleware, a book on office work, Tom DeMarco and Tim Lister report that in an office environment, workers may take 15 minutes to achieve this state of flow in their concentration, and that it can be destroyed in a moment by an interruption, such as a telephone call.

The task may be fascinating so that it allows "effortless attention", or may have sufficient scope to sustain interaction without boredom, or may simply be more compatible with a person's interests. However, after a period of directed attention, people develop "directed attention fatigue". They become distracted, irritable, and impatient. They become less effective in performing their tasks.

Attention may be "restored" by changing to a different kind of task that uses different parts of the brain, as in the familiar idiom "a change is as good as a rest". Alternatively, exposure to natural environments and wilderness has psychological benefits including attention restoration.

Nature has an abundance of fascinating objects. "Soft fascinations" such as clouds in the sky or leaves rustling in a breeze, gain our attention relatively effortlessly and are compatible with our wants and needs. This is in comparison with snakes and spiders, which may gain our attention out of fear. The biophilia hypothesis argues that people are instinctively enthusiastic about nature, and both Fuller et al. and Irvine et al. suggests that the positive psychological effect increases as the perceived biodiversity of the landscape increases.

After spending some time of effortless attention with soft fascinations and removed from their day-to-day tasks, people may have a chance to reflect. This brings a "restorative" benefit which thus enables further attention.

Stress reduction
After medical surgery, patients resting in rooms overlooking trees recovered better than those in rooms with only a view of a brick wall. They experienced fewer complications from the surgery, recovered faster, and asked for weaker painkiller drugs. Similarly, natural scenes can reduce stress before an event.

Women with breast cancer who walked in a park, watched birds, or tended flowers, achieved better attention after surgery. Merely keeping sight of natural features improves self-discipline in inner-city girls. Children in New York State were less stressed by adversity when they lived in rural areas. Stress in college examinations was similarly reduced by viewing natural scenes. Viewing scenes of urban streets and artifacts excluding nature did not achieve any stress reduction, in a similar study upon workers viewing a film about industrial accidents.

Taking breaks outside in settings that contained some nature has been shown to reduce stress, leaving nurses feeling refreshed, relaxed, and energized upon return to work.

See also
 Attention span
 Attentional retraining
 Ecopsychology
 Environmental psychology
 Green exercise
 Nature deficit disorder
 Outdoor education

References

Attention
Behavioral concepts